Zolgörən (also, Zolgəran and Zolgeran) is a village and municipality in the Tartar Rayon of Azerbaijan.  It has a population of 300.

References 

Populated places in Tartar District